Beer's Bridge is a historic Pratt Pony truss bridge over the Ausable River at Keene Valley in Essex County, New York.  It was built in 1900 by the Pratt, Tomas & Caleb Company.

It was listed on the National Register of Historic Places in 1999.

References

Road bridges on the National Register of Historic Places in New York (state)
Bridges completed in 1900
Bridges in Essex County, New York
National Register of Historic Places in Essex County, New York
Pratt truss bridges in the United States